Cyient (formerly Infotech Enterprises Limited) is an Indian multinational technology company that is focused on engineering, manufacturing, data analytics, and networks and operations. Infotech Enterprises Ltd. was established in 1991 in Hyderabad. Infotech Enterprises was re-branded as Cyient in 2014 and was featured among the top 30 outsourcing companies in the world in 2018.

History
Cyient was established as Infotech Enterprises Ltd. in 1991 in Hyderabad by B. V. R. Mohan Reddy. In 1995, the company received its first ISO 9002 certification from BVQi London for its conversion services. Infotech Enterprises started its operations as a private limited to provide engineering service to global markets. It encountered a strong resistance to the very concept of engineering outsourcing, but found immediate opportunity in the GIS arena. Cyient became a public limited company in 1997, had an IPO of equity shares at ₹ 20/- per share and listed in all major stock exchanges in India. Around 1999, it signed a breakthrough contract to provide GIS conversion and consultation mapping services worth US$5.5 million to US based Analytical Surveys, Inc. Within the same year, the company acquired Cartographic Sciences from Analytical Surveys, Inc. In June 1999, the company acquired Dataview Solutions Limited, a UK based GIS Software Company. The company continued to pursue engineering services, and finally got a major breakthrough with a leading aircraft engine manufacturer in the year 2000 for engineering services.

In 2000, Cyient announced the acquisition of a German company, Advanced Graphics Software GmbH (AGS), a mechanical engineering software and services company specialising in 3D CAD/CAM. In 2002, Infotech announced a strategic business relationship with the Pratt & Whitney division of United Technologies Corporation, a Fortune 100 company. Pratt & Whitney were to participate with up to ~18% equity stake in Infotech, demonstrating long-term partnering intent and endorsing Infotech's business competence. In 2005, Infotech acquired Tele Atlas India Pvt Ltd. Tele Atlas parent company joined as a strategic partner with preferential allotment of shares. Cyient's founder, B V R Mohan Reddy, was elected Chairman of the Confederation of Indian Industry (CII) Southern Region in 2008. On January 15, 2010, Daxcon was acquired by Infotech Enterprises America, Inc; a wholly owned subsidiary of Infotech Enterprises Limited, India. In March 2013, Cyient became public with its own initial public offering (IPO).

Infotech Enterprises Limited adopted the Cyient name in 2014. On May 7, 2014, Cyient Limited, formerly known as Infotech Enterprises Limited, officially announced its new name based on approval from a shareholders' vote. The process of determining the new identity, bearing connotations to the words client and science, while Cyient referencing Infotech Enterprises, involved various brand specialists, and the new name was tested in 17 languages. After changing its name, Cyient relocated its US headquarters in Connecticut to a new building. Infotech Enterprises acquired Softential, Inc in 2014, Cyient also acquired Invati Insights in 2014, with the new entity named Cyient Insights. In 2015, Cyient acquired Pratt & Whitney Global Services Engineering Asia and Rangsons Electronics.  On February 8, 2017, Cyient Inc. agreed to acquire Certon Software Inc. On April 25, 2022, Cyient announced to acquire the Finnish plant and product engineering services company Citec.

Facilities and staff

Founded in Hyderabad, India, by February 2017 Cyient had around 14,000 employees in 21 countries in Asia, Europe, and North America. Among other facilities, it has offices in Electronic City in Bangalore, India. Globally, offices are located in countries such as Australia, Canada, France, Germany, Japan, Malaysia, the Netherlands, New Zealand, Norway, Singapore, South Korea, Sweden, Switzerland, Taiwan, the United Arab Emirates, the United Kingdom and the United States.
 
In January 2017, Cyient opened facilities at the Incubation Centre of the Telangana State Industrial Infrastructure Corporation in Warangal, also began to build a 70,000 square feet Technology Development Centre at Madikonda Special Economic Zone in Warangal. In February 2017, Cyient and ANSYS agreed to "set up a simulation lab at Cyient’s Experience Centre in Hyderabad." The Cyient-ANSYS Simulation Lab is to be able in particular to develop proof-of-concepts (POC) for Cyient and its clients.

With its United States headquarters in the state of Connecticut, in return for a pledge to add 85 jobs to the state, in February 2017, Cyient Inc. in East Hartford received a $500,000 loan from the state Department of Economic and Community Development for new machinery and equipment. At the time, Cyient was a supplier to Connecticut engine builders and employed 456 full-time workers in Connecticut.

The group companies are:
 Cyient, Inc
 Cyient Europe Ltd
 Cyient GmbH
 Cyient Ltd (Japan)
 Cyient Insights
 Cyient Singapore Pte Ltd
 Cyient Design Led Manufacturing 
 Certon
 Blom Aerofilms

Products
Cyient Limited as of 2014 provides "software-enabled engineering & geographic information system (GIS) services."

Awards and recognition
The company was named supplier of the Year from The Boeing Company in 2010. 

In 2011, Cyient founder B V R Mohan Reddy received the ASME Leadership Award. 

In 2012, the company was awarded the Indo-American Corporate Excellence Award for Best Indian Company operating in the US under the Technology & Communications Category. 

It was named supplier of the year from The Boeing Company for the second time in 2013, winning the next year as well for the third time. 

The company was featured among the top 30 outsourcing companies in the world in 2014.

See also

List of companies of India 
List of Indian IT companies 
Software industry in Telangana
Information technology in India
Electronics and semiconductor manufacturing industry in India

References

External links
 

Multinational companies headquartered in India
Companies based in Hyderabad, India
Outsourcing
Outsourcing in India
Software companies established in 1991
Software companies of India
Engineering companies of India
International information technology consulting firms
Information technology consulting firms of India
Outsourcing companies
Indian brands
Indian companies established in 1991
1997 establishments in Andhra Pradesh
Companies listed on the National Stock Exchange of India
Companies listed on the Bombay Stock Exchange